Tawala may be,

Tawala language
Abdul Tawala Ibn Ali Alishtari